Kelechi Harrison or Harrison Kelechi Ukawulazu (born 13 January 1999 in Imo State) is a Nigerian football player who currently plays in the Nigeria Premier League for Warri Wolves.
In 2018/2019 season he signed for newly promoted Togolese Championat Nationale club Sara Sports de Bafilo where he had a very successful season before being re-signed by Warri Wolves for the 2019/2020 season. He first professional contract with Warri Wolves while on a pre-season trial tournament with Bendel Insurance  who were ready to offer him a professional contract as well, but he chose Wolves because he wanted to play in the CAF Champions League.

A very fast and double-footed winger who can play on both flanks and in the centre of the offensive midfield. His admirers liken him to Eden Hazard because of his style of play.

Career
Kelechi Harrison spent his academy years at Karamone  but made his professional debut with Warri Wolves  in 2015 at the Super Four tournament of the Nigeria Professional Football League (NPFL). He later signed for Ikorodu United F.C.  in 2015/16 the following  Nigeria Premier League season. He was invited to the Nigeria U-20 in 2015.

References

1998 births
Living people
Nigerian footballers
Nigeria Professional Football League players
Association football defenders
Nigerian expatriate footballers
Expatriate footballers in Nigeria
Ikorodu United F.C. players
Warri Wolves F.C. players
Karamone F.C. players
Igbo sportspeople
Sportspeople from Imo State